Derrick America is a South African politician who is currently serving as a Member of the Western Cape Provincial Parliament, representing the Democratic Alliance. From 2014 to 2019, he served as a Member of the National Assembly of South Africa.

Early life and career
In high school, America was a vocal opponent of apartheid and organised student protests. He first started work at the South African Post Office, where he had a confrontation with management about the apartheid system in place for employees. 
America was then educated at the University of the Western Cape where he received a Bachelor of Commerce with Honours. His area of study focused on management and the labour market. He subsequently completed a Master of Business Administration at the Curtin University in Perth, Australia. America then worked as a school teacher, teaching business economics and accounting. He then served as an academic at Cape Peninsula University of Technology until 2009, lecturing in labour law and business courses. America also arbitrated on labour disputes at the Commission for Concilliation Mediation and Arbitration from 2009–2011.

Political career
America was first elected as a Councillor in the City of Cape Town in May 2011. He represented residents of Kensington, Factreton, Maitland until 2014. He was elected as a Member of the National Assembly of South Africa in May 2014, representing the Democratic Alliance. He was elected to the Western Cape Provincial Parliament in 2019.

References

 Living people
Arbitrators
Academic staff of Cape Peninsula University of Technology
 Curtin University alumni
 Democratic Alliance (South Africa) politicians
 Members of the National Assembly of South Africa
 South African expatriates in Australia
 South African schoolteachers
 University of the Western Cape alumni
 Place of birth missing (living people)
20th-century South African educators
 Year of birth missing (living people)
21st-century South African politicians